Cantonese naamyam (Jyutping: naam4 jam1; pinyin: nányīn) is a unique local narrative singing tradition in Cantonese dialect/language, different from the nanyin (or nanguan) tradition originating from southern Fujian. A singer would be engaged for a single performance or for regular performances over an extended period of time. Famous naamyam singers included Chung Tak (1860–1929), Dou Wun (1910–1979), Yuen Siu-fai and Au Kwan-cheung.

See also
 Cantonese opera
 Cantopop
 Huangmei Opera
 Beijing Opera
 Music of China
 Music of Hong Kong

External links 
 Cantonese Narrative Song Naamyam: Hong Kong Cultural Treasure

Cantonese culture
Chinese storytelling
Chinese folk music